Hendrik Torge Schmidt (born 30 July 1988) is a former German politician. He was a member of the Landtag of Schleswig-Holstein from 2012 to 2017, and leader of the Pirate Party faction from May 2013 to April 2016.

Early life 
Schmidt was born in Itzehoe.

Political career 
On 18 June 2017, he announced his departure from the Pirate Party on his blog.

References 

1988 births
Living people

People from Itzehoe
Members of the Landtag of Schleswig-Holstein
21st-century German politicians
Pirate Party Germany politicians